Beth Nyambura Mbaya, known professionally as Wanade (c. 1967 – May 10, 2013), was a Kenyan television actress. A well known actress within Kenya, Wanade was best known for starring roles in several, locally produced television series including Mother in Law and Know Zone.

Wanade was married to Robert Mbaya.  The couple had two sons both of whom entered show business: Mungai Mbaya, who is the host of the children's show, Know Zone, and an actor on the Kenya Broadcasting Corporation (KBC) soap opera, Makutano Junction, and actor Kamau Mbaya, who is best known for playing Baha on the Machachari series which airs on citizen TV Kenya and starring in the Kenyan Biography of Kimani Maruge, The First Grader. . Wanade's older sister is the Kenyan screenwriter, Naomi Kamau, while her brother Joseph Kinuthia, known by the stage name, Omosh, has starred in the television show, Tahidi High.

Wanade died from cancer at her sister's home in the Kahawa Sukari suburb of Nairobi on May 10, 2013, at the age of 46.

References

2013 deaths
Kenyan television actresses
People from Nairobi
1940s births